Whole Azerbaijan is an irredentist concept of uniting presumed historically Azerbaijani-inhabited territories into the Republic of Azerbaijan.

History 
The idea of "Whole Azerbaijan" was formulated by Piruz Dilanchi in 1991  and defined in 1992 by Azerbaijani president Abulfaz Elchibey (s. 1992-93). In 1991, Dilanchi founded the SANLM nationalist organization and in 1997 Elchibey founded the "Whole Azerbaijan Union" (Bütöv Azərbaycan Birliyi) organization. Elchibey published his book on the idea, Bütöv Azərbaycan yolunda, in Turkey in 1998. It claimed that the borders of Azerbaijan should extend from Derbent to the Persian Gulf. Elchibey claimed that this was a territory of Azerbaijani historical ethnic presence. He proposed that Azerbaijan had right to rule it, under a proposed system of governance called "United Azerbaijani Lands" (Birləşmiş Azərbaycan Yurdları). After his death in 2002, it was published postmortem. He opposed the idea of a separate and independent South Azerbaijan.

Political initiatives 
The term Whole Azerbaijan continued in political initiatives including the SANLM (CAMAH)  and Whole Azerbaijan Popular Front Party.

Boundaries 
Although the boundaries of Whole Azerbaijan are not strictly defined, some proponents portray them as encompassing the following areas:

 South Azerbaijan (Cənubi Azərbaycan) -  provinces of East Azerbaijan, West Azerbaijan, Ardabil and Zanjan
 Western Azerbaijan (Qərbi Azərbaycan) -  all of the territory of Armenia
  Derbent (Dərbənd) -   Derbentsky district, Republic of Dagestan
 Borchali (Borçalı) -  part of the Kvemo Kartli province of Georgia

See also
Azerbaijan–Iran border
Azerbaijani nationalism
Southern Azerbaijan National Awakening Movement
Zangezur Corridor
Western Azerbaijan (political concept)

References

External links

Azerbaijani nationalism
Azerbaijan
Politics of Azerbaijan
Azerbaijani irredentism